The 1994 United States Senate election in Utah was held November 8, 1994. Incumbent Republican U.S. Senator Orrin Hatch won re-election to a fourth term. This was Orrin Hatch best performance from all of his runs for senate.

Major candidates

Democratic 
Patrick A. Shea, Utah Democratic Party chair since 1983, Gubernatorial primary candidate in 1992, lawyer

Republican 
 Orrin Hatch, incumbent U.S. Senator

Results

See also 
 1994 United States Senate elections

References 

United States Senate
Utah
1994